Jack Doheny may refer to:

 A character in Powder Blue (film)
 A character in The Death Dealers